Natmauk Township is a township of Magway District in the Magway Division of Myanmar.  The principal town is Natmauk. It is the place where General Aung San who is national hero of Myanmar and father of Aung San Su Kyi, was born.

References

Townships of Magway Region